Dietrich Jells (born April 11, 1972, in Erie, Pennsylvania) is a retired American football wide receiver. Jells played in the NFL from 1996 to 1999. In his first two seasons, Jells was a member of the New England Patriots after being drafted out of the University of Pittsburgh by the Kansas City Chiefs in the 1996 NFL Draft. With the Patriots, Jells appeared in Super Bowl XXXI, a Patriots loss. In 1998–99, Jells played with the Philadelphia Eagles. Jells scored two career touchdowns, both in 1999 as an Eagle.

References

1972 births
Living people
Sportspeople from Brooklyn
Players of American football from New York City
Pittsburgh Panthers football players
American football wide receivers
New England Patriots players
Philadelphia Eagles players